The 2004–2005 Sparta Rotterdam season saw the club play in the  Dutch Second League for a third year running.

Matches

Eerste Divisie

Nacompetitie

Amstel Cup

Players

|-
|}

See also
2004–05 in Dutch football

External links
RSSSF
Ronaldzwiers 
Voetbal International
Footballdatabase

Sparta Rotterdam seasons
Sparta Rotterdam